Jacques Viaene (1932 – 1 June 1958) was a French water polo player. He competed in the men's tournament at the 1948 Summer Olympics.

References

1932 births
1958 deaths
French male water polo players
Olympic water polo players of France
Water polo players at the 1948 Summer Olympics